Lynna Irby (born December 6, 1998) is an American track and field sprinter who competes in the 100m, 200m, and 400m dash events. At the 400m dash, she set an all-time world record at the age of 12 running 54.57 before becoming the fastest American 400m high school runner in the last 20 years. She gained 16 national titles from Jr Olympic and Youth National meets. Irby has won silver medals in the event at both the 2015 World Youth Championships and the 2016 World Junior Championships.

Career
Irby started running track at the age of nine for the Indiana Storm Track Club. She attended Pike High School, where she won Gatorade Player of the year for the state of Indiana in 2015 and in 2016. She was also awarded the 2016 Indiana Sports Award presented by the Indianapolis Star newspaper, and earned Pike High School's MVP 3 years straight. Irby led her high school team to runner up at the state meet her Freshman year earning 30 individual points. Her sophomore year Irby again earned 30 individual points plus anchored the 4X400 team securing the state championship win for Pike. Irby's Junior year at Pike HS, she once again earned 30 individual points and anchored on the 4X400 but it wasn't enough to beat the Lady Warriors of Warren Central High School.

She gained 16 national titles from Jr Olympic and Youth National meets and made world teams for the 2015 World Youth Championships and the 2016 World U20 Championships. While representing USA, Irby got the silver in the 400 meters running 51.79 (U18 - 2015) and 51.39 (U20 - 2016). She also ran on the 4X400 relay both years winning gold and in the 4X100 prelim (U20 - 2016) also winning gold.

Irby took several AP and Honor courses while in High School and maintained a high GPA. Nationally the Class of 2017 has many top track and field recruits such as Katia Seymour, Lauren Rain Williams (100m runners), Lauryn Ghee, Jayla Kirkland (200m runners), and Sydney McLaughlin (400M-Hurdler), Sammy Watson (800m runner). Irby was listed in all 3 sprints as one of the top recruits but the absolute top recruit in the 400m of this national graduating class by Milesplit.

Irby is 45–0 in the state of Indiana postseason having won 9 individual state titles in all sprints. Olympic Gold Medalist Maicel Malone finished her North Central HS track career with 11-12 individual state titles in the 1980s. Irby finished with 12-12 by the end of her Pike high school career in 2017 by sweeping all 3 sprints all 4 years of high school, becoming the first one to ever sweep all 3 sprints all 4 years of high school. Irby owns the Indiana indoor state record in the 60m with a Personal Best of 7.46 (2016) and the 100m outdoor record at 11.41 (2017).

Achievements

International competitions

National competitions

References

External links

 (Track & Field Results Reporting System)
Video of Irby's 400 m collegiate record by the NCAA via YouTube

1998 births
Living people
African-American female track and field athletes
American female sprinters
Georgia Lady Bulldogs track and field athletes
Pan American Games track and field athletes for the United States
Athletes (track and field) at the 2019 Pan American Games
Pan American Games gold medalists for the United States
Pan American Games bronze medalists for the United States
Pan American Games medalists in athletics (track and field)
Medalists at the 2019 Pan American Games
Athletes (track and field) at the 2020 Summer Olympics
Medalists at the 2020 Summer Olympics
Olympic gold medalists for the United States in track and field
Olympic bronze medalists for the United States in track and field
21st-century African-American sportspeople
21st-century African-American women
Track and field athletes from Indiana